Allan John Mullenger (12 April 1920 – 10 March 2002) was an Australian rules footballer who played for the South Melbourne Football Club in the Victorian Football League (VFL).

Mullenger also served in the Australian Army for four years during World War II.

Notes

External links 
		

1920 births
2002 deaths
Australian rules footballers from Melbourne
Sydney Swans players
People from Fairfield, Victoria
Australian Army personnel of World War II
Military personnel from Melbourne